Aletheia or Alethia is truth or disclosure in philosophy. Originating in Ancient Greek philosophy, the term was later used in the works of 20th-century philosopher Martin Heidegger. Although often translated as "truth", Heidegger argued that it is distinct from common conceptions of truth.

Antiquity
 is variously translated as "unconcealedness", "disclosure", "revealing", or "unclosedness". The literal meaning of the word  is "the state of not being hidden; the state of being evident." It also means factuality or reality.

In Greek mythology,  was personified as a Greek goddess, Aletheia. In some accounts she was a daughter of Zeus, while Aesop's Fables state she was crafted by Prometheus. In  she was equated with Veritas, the Roman goddess of truth.

Heidegger and aletheia

In the early to mid 20th-century, Martin Heidegger brought renewed attention to the concept of aletheia, by relating it to the notion of disclosure, or the way in which things appear as entities in the world. While he initially referred to aletheia as "truth", specifically a form that is pre-Socratic in origin, Heidegger eventually corrected this interpretation, writing:

Heidegger gave an etymological analysis of aletheia and drew out an understanding of the term as 'unconcealedness'. Thus, aletheia is distinct from conceptions of truth understood as statements which accurately describe a state of affairs (correspondence), or statements which fit properly into a system taken as a whole (coherence). Instead, Heidegger focused on the elucidation of how an ontological "world" is disclosed, or opened up, in which things are made intelligible for human beings in the first place, as part of a holistically structured background of meaning.

Heidegger also wrote that , disclosure regarded as the opening of presence, is not yet truth. Is  then less than truth?

Heidegger began his discourse on the reappropriation of aletheia in his magnum opus, Being and Time (1927), and expanded on the concept in his Introduction to Metaphysics. For more on his understanding of aletheia, see Poetry, Language, and Thought, in particular the essay entitled "The Origin of the Work of Art", which describes the value of the work of art as a means to open a "clearing" for the appearance of things in the world, or to disclose their meaning for human beings. Heidegger revised his views on aletheia as truth, after nearly forty years, in the essay "The End of Philosophy and the Task of Thinking," in On Time and Being.

See also

References

Further reading

External links
 Aletheia and Other Terms for Truth in Ancient Greek
 Pre-Philosophical Conceptions of Truth: Homer, Hesiod, Pindar, Alexandrine Poets, Thucydides
 Martin Heidegger on Aletheia (Truth) as Unconcealment

Concepts in metaphysics
Martin Heidegger
Truth
Personifications in Greek mythology